The 2007 Ekiti State gubernatorial election was the 3rd gubernatorial election of Ekiti State. Held on 14 April 2007, the People's Democratic Party nominee Olusegun Oni won the election, defeating Kayode Fayemi of the Action Congress of Nigeria.

Results 
Olusegun Oni from the People's Democratic Party won the election, defeating Kayode Fayemi from the Action Congress of Nigeria. Registered voters was 771,228.

References 

Ekiti State gubernatorial elections
Ekiti gubernatorial
April 2007 events in Nigeria